Ocean Drive is an American luxury lifestyle and fashion magazine first published in January 1993 by Jason Binn and Jerry Powers. With focus on the affluent culture of Miami and its surrounding areas, it covers "trends on fashion, beauty, art, travel, real estate, and entertainment."

It has been called the "Bible of South Florida".

A  show based on the magazine was broadcast in the late 1990s by WAMI-TV, hosted by model Hunter Reno.

Notable covers

Models

Tyra Banks
Charlotte McKinney (2020)
Naomi Campbell
Camille Kostek (2019)
 Heidi Klum (2009, 2021)
 Adriana Lima
Elle Macpherson (2014)
Claudia Schiffer
 Chrissy Teigen
Erin Heatherton (2014)
Miranda Kerr
Olivia Culpo (2017, 2021)
Camila Alves McConaughey (2017)
Joanna Krupa (2007, 2009)

Entertainers and actresses
Katie Holmes
Jaime Pressly
Camila Cabello
Beyoncé
Jennifer Lopez
 Ricky Martin
Madonna (1997)
Mila Kunis (2008)
 Gabrielle Union
Jordana Brewster (2013) 
Molly Sims (2002)
Lili Reinhart (2018)
Enrique Iglesias (2011, 2021)
Paris Hilton (2003, 2006, 2017)
Claire Holt (2021)

Athletes
 Derek Jeter
 Alex Rodriguez
 Dwyane Wade
Caroline Wozniacki

References

External links
Official website

Magazines established in 1993
1993 establishments in Florida
Women's magazines published in the United States
Lifestyle magazines published in the United States
Magazines published in Florida
Bimonthly magazines published in the United States
Women in Florida